Bucheki or Bucheke is a city in the Nankana Sahib District, Punjab province, Pakistan. It is located at 31°18'18N 73°39'34E and has an altitude of 180 meters (590 feet). It is about 80 km west of Lahore and 15 km south of Nankana Sahib (the birthplace of Guru Nanak Sahib).

Bucheki connects to the village of Shah Purah in the north via the Sayyedwala road. The Nala Daik river passes through the middle of the town.  The city has expanded its size to 43 km2 by absorbing 16 nearby villages into its area. It has a total population of 276,391 people according to the 2019 census.

As a rich aroma rice growing area, the city is known for its more than 70 rice mills and its markets exporting rice to international destinations.

City sectors
 

Bucheki's main bazaar has merchants selling goods ranging from books to jewellery.  The grain and nut market is open during the harvest seasons for wheat (May – June) and rice (September – November). During this time, large crowds come and trucks loaded with exported and imported crops enter the city. The city has a significantly larger shopping complex than neighbouring towns, thus attracting people from surrounding communities to fill their shopping needs.

The city has five housing societies:
Heaven City,
Usman Town,
Mughal Garden,
Sayyed Town, and
Paradise Gulshan

Bucheki has five colleges and a women's university.  It has 50 secondary school.

"Suno TV" has been established as a media platform by Brig(R) Aftab Ahmad Khan who hails from this village. The village is also home to Brig(R) Ejaz Ahmad Shah.

The postal code for Bucheki is 39130. This post office operates from Qila Sheikhupura postal office. This postal office is located in the Punjab province in Pakistan, it is a general post office and has an attached branch office within it. The postal code of the attached branch postal office is 39131.

Politics
 
During the elections, Bucheki dominated the headquarters of the constituencies of both the national assemblies (NA 137) and the provincial assembly (PP 174). In the past, Bucheki has played a crucial part for the constituency by electing numerous leaders who have come and gone.
All the elected leaders have forgotten the town once they took their seats in national assemblies and thus Bucheki has not seen any development whatsoever.

References

Populated places in Nankana Sahib District